Jennie Waara (born 10 January 1975) is a Swedish snowboarder.

She was born in Gällivare. She competed at the 1998 Winter Olympics, in halfpipe.

References

External links 
 

1975 births
Living people
People from Gällivare Municipality
Swedish female snowboarders
Olympic snowboarders of Sweden
Snowboarders at the 1998 Winter Olympics
Sportspeople from Norrbotten County